Kenneth J. Meier (born March 3, 1950) is a distinguished scholar in residence at American University and holds faculty appointments at the Cardiff School of Business (UK) and Leiden University (the Netherlands). He is known for his studies on public management and public administration, as well as his extensive and widely referenced journal articles.

Career

Meier obtained a bachelor's degree from the University of South Dakota.
 Meier, a former high school shot put champion, also competed for the track teams at the University of Nebraska and the University of South Dakota.  In 1974-1975, he received an M.A. and a Ph.D. from the Maxwell School of Citizenship and Public Affairs at Syracuse University in political science. After working on the faculty at Rice University and University of Oklahoma, he joined the University of Wisconsin–Madison in 1985. Between 1989 and 1997 he was professor of political science at the University of Wisconsin–Milwaukee. Meier was a professor of political science at Texas A&M University from 1998 to 2017, holding the title of Charles H. Gregory Chair in Liberal Arts.

Meier is a distinguished scholar in residence at American University from 2018 to the present. In addition, he is a professor of public management at Cardiff Business School and a professor of public administration at Leiden University.

He is a former editor-in-chief of Journal of Public Administration Research and Theory (JPART), for which he previously served as associate editor and co-editor.  He was also the editor of the American Journal of Political Science from 1994-1997. Meier is the founding editor of Perspectives on Public Management and Governance (PPMG) and founder and editor of the Journal of Behavioral Public Administration (JBPA). He currently serves as the director of the Public Management Research Association (PMRA) journals.

Selected awards and honors
 Charles Levine Memorial Award, American Society for Public Administration and National Association of Schools of Public Affairs and Administration, 2005
 Fellow, National Academy of Public Administration, 2005
 John Gaus Award, American Political Science Association, 2006
 Dwight Waldo Award, American Society for Public Administration, 2010
 H. George Frederickson Award, Public Management Research Association, 2011

Selected publications

References

External links
 Meier's official faculty page at American University

American political scientists
1950 births
Living people
Public administration scholars
Maxwell School of Citizenship and Public Affairs alumni
Texas A&M University faculty
University of South Dakota alumni
University of Wisconsin–Madison faculty
University of Wisconsin–Milwaukee faculty